Nalatawad  is a village in the southern state of Karnataka, India. It is located in the Muddebihal taluk of Bijapur district in Karnataka.

Demographics
 India census, Nalatawad had a population of 13558 with 6918 males and 6640 females.

See also
 Muddebihal
 Districts of Karnataka

References

External links
 http://Muddebihal.nic.in/
 http://Bijapur.nic.in/

Villages in Bijapur district, Karnataka